Nils Villy Cederborg (15 November 1925 in Nynäshamn, Sweden — 21 May 2001 in Stockholm, Sweden) is a former Swedish footballer. He made 102 Allsvenskan appearances for Djurgårdens IF and scored 42 goals.

References

Swedish footballers
Djurgårdens IF Fotboll players
1925 births
2001 deaths
Association footballers not categorized by position